Pensiri Laosirikul (born January 17, 1984, in Nakhon Si Thammarat) is a Thai weightlifting athlete, and is of Chinese descent.

She is 4'9" (144 cm) tall and weighs 47.67 kg.

She competed in the 2008 Olympic Games, in Beijing, winning a bronze medal.

At the 2007 World Championships in Chiang Mai, she took 2nd place in the  clean and jerk (112 kg), 3rd place overall (195 kg) and 7th place in the snatch (83 kg).

At the Asian Championships, she took 3rd place overall (191 kg) and in the clean and jerk (110 kg), and 4th place for the snatch (81 kg). The competition was held in Tai'an (China).

At the 2008 Summer Olympics in Beijing, she lifted 85 kg in the snatch and 110 kg in the clean and jerk, resulting in a total of 195 kg.

Notes and references

External links
 Athlete Biography at beijing2008

1984 births
Living people
Pensiri Laosirikul
Pensiri Laosirikul
Olympic medalists in weightlifting
Pensiri Laosirikul
Pensiri Laosirikul
Weightlifters at the 2008 Summer Olympics
Asian Games medalists in weightlifting
Weightlifters at the 2006 Asian Games
Weightlifters at the 2010 Asian Games
Pensiri Laosirikul
Medalists at the 2006 Asian Games
Medalists at the 2010 Asian Games
Universiade medalists in weightlifting
Universiade bronze medalists for Thailand
Medalists at the 2008 Summer Olympics
World Weightlifting Championships medalists
Medalists at the 2011 Summer Universiade
Pensiri Laosirikul
Pensiri Laosirikul
Pensiri Laosirikul